The 100,000 yen coin is a denomination of the Japanese yen. Only two different types of coins have ever been struck in this denomination, which is only used for the minting of commemorative coins struck by the Japan Mint. Proof coinage and uncirculated examples were made for collectors, none were ever intended or released for circulation.

History
The 100,000 yen coin is the highest non circulating denomination ever issued by the Japan Mint. Only two different types of coins have ever been struck in this denomination. The issues  include celebratory events such as Hirohito's 60th year of reign from 1986 to 1987, and the enthronement of Emperor Akihito in 1990.

Commemoratives

Notes

References

External links
Commemorative coins issued - Japan Mint website (In English)

Japanese yen coins
Commemorative coins of Japan